Dimitar Nikolov Yakimov (born 12 August 1941) is a Bulgarian former professional footballer who played as an attacking midfielder or forward. He represented Septemvri Sofia and CSKA Sofia at club level, and the Bulgaria national team internationally.

International career
Yakimov was part of the Bulgaria under-18 team that won the 1959 UEFA European Under-18 Championship. On 11 October 1959, he first played for the Bulgarian senior squad, in a match versus France. Yakimov played for Bulgaria at the 1960 Summer Olympics.

Honours
Septemvri Sofia
Bulgarian Cup: 1959–60

CSKA Sofia
Bulgarian League (7): 1960–61, 1961–62, 1965–66, 1968–69, 1970–71, 1971–72, 1972–73
Bulgarian Cup: 1960–61, 1964–65, 1968–69, 1971–72

Individual
 Bulgarian League top scorer: 1970–71

References

1941 births
Living people
Bulgarian footballers
Bulgaria international footballers
First Professional Football League (Bulgaria) players
FC Septemvri Sofia players
PFC CSKA Sofia players
Olympic footballers of Bulgaria
Footballers at the 1960 Summer Olympics
1962 FIFA World Cup players
1966 FIFA World Cup players
1970 FIFA World Cup players
Association football forwards
Association football midfielders
Macedonian Bulgarians
People from Kratovo Municipality